Prasanna Bhalachandra Varale (born June 23, 1962) is an Indian judge. He serves as Chief Justice of Karnataka High Court. He is a former judge of the Bombay High Court.

Early life
He was born on June 23, 1962 at Nipani. He graduated in arts and law from Dr. Babasaheb Ambedkar Marathwada University.

Career 
He enrolled as an Advocate in 1985. He was appointed as an additional judge of the Bombay High Court on July 18, 2008 and made permanent on July 15, 2011. He was elevated to Chief Justice of Karnataka High Court on October 15, 2022.

References

 

Indian judges
1962 births
Living people
Dr. Babasaheb Ambedkar Marathwada University alumni